Galust Aloyan (1864 in Yerevan – 1914) was an Armenian fedayi and one of the Armenian national liberation movement figures.

References

1864 births
1914 deaths
Armenian nationalists
Military personnel from Yerevan
Armenian fedayi